Sukhdev Prasad (1921-1995) was an Indian politician. He was a member of the Rajya Sabha, the upper house of the Parliament of India representing Uttar Pradesh as a member of the Indian National Congress for 3 terms. He was the Union Deputy Minister for Steel and Mines from 1973 to 1977.

References

1921 births
1995 deaths
Rajya Sabha members from Uttar Pradesh
Indian National Congress politicians from Uttar Pradesh
Governors of Rajasthan
Steel Ministers of India
Members of the Cabinet of India